Miss World 1981, the 31st edition of the Miss World pageant, was held on 12 November 1981 at the Royal Albert Hall in London, UK. The winner was Pilín León from Venezuela, the first titleholder from her country since 1955. She was crowned by Miss World 1980, Kimberley Santos of Guam. Another Venezuelan, Irene Sáez, had been crowned Miss Universe 1981 in July, making Venezuela one of the few countries to hold both major international titles (Miss Universe and Miss World) in the same year. The Continental Queens of Beauty were awarded for the first time.

Results

Placements

Continental Queens of Beauty

Contestants

Notes

Returns

Last competed in 1966:
 
Last competed in 1979:

Withdrawals
 
 
 
  – Paula Dos Santos who had a dual citizenship, won the Miss Portugal contest held in Johannesburg, South Africa. She flew to London, only to be told by Eric Morley that any girl from South Africa cannot participate, and that the contest has to be held in the country of the girl's origin.

References

Further reading
 Ottawa Citizen. September 10, 1981.

External links
 Pageantopolis – Miss World 1981

Miss World
1981 in London
1981 beauty pageants
Beauty pageants in the United Kingdom
Events at the Royal Albert Hall
November 1981 events in the United Kingdom